David James Brown (born October 12, 1962) is a Canadian former professional ice hockey right winger who played 14 seasons in the National Hockey League (NHL) for the Philadelphia Flyers, Edmonton Oilers and San Jose Sharks. He was primarily known as an enforcer throughout his career. He is currently the Flyers' head of pro scouting.

Playing career
Brown was suspended for 15 games for cross-checking New York Rangers forward Tomas Sandström, breaking his jaw and causing a concussion. At that time, it was among the stiffest penalties in NHL history.  Brown's name was engraved on the Stanley Cup in 1990 with Edmonton.

Awards
1989–90 - NHL - Stanley Cup (Edmonton)

Career statistics

References

External links
 
 Meltzer, Bill, Flyers Heroes of the Past: Dave Brown (Part 1) at PhiladelphiaFlyers.com. Retrieved December 1, 2013.
 Meltzer, Bill, Flyers Heroes of the Past: Dave Brown (Part 2) at PhiladelphiaFlyers.com. Retrieved December 1, 2013.

1962 births
Living people
Canadian ice hockey right wingers
Edmonton Oilers players
Ice hockey people from Saskatchewan
Maine Mariners players
New York Rangers scouts
Philadelphia Flyers coaches
Philadelphia Flyers draft picks
Philadelphia Flyers players
Philadelphia Flyers scouts
San Jose Sharks players
Saskatoon Blades players
Spokane Flyers players
Sportspeople from Saskatoon
Springfield Indians players
Stanley Cup champions
Canadian ice hockey coaches